Kenyatta Terrell Wright (born February 19, 1978 in Vian, Oklahoma) is a former American football linebacker who played for the New York Jets of the NFL from 2003-2005.  He was a four-year starter for Oklahoma State University, where he recorded 260 career tackles, 11 sacks, and 1 fumble recovery.  He was signed as a free agent in 2000 by the Buffalo Bills.
Was the vaunted leader of the Oklahoma State "Orange Crush Defense".

Professional career
As an undrafted free agent out of Oklahoma State University, he first signed with the Buffalo Bills and played for two years under defensive co-ordinator Ted Cottrell. In 2003 Ted Cottrell joined the New York Jets as defensive co-ordinator and brought Kenyatta with him, who would go onto spend 3 of his 5 seasons in Green and White. He played a key role in the Jets special teams under Mike Westhoff on route to a 10-6 record and playoff berth in 2004.

Kenyatta Wright retired in 2006.

Personal life
Wright is married with two sons who both play college football, Elijah is a linebacker at The University of Central Oklahoma and Solomon is a defensive tackle on the roster at Oklahoma State University.

References

American football linebackers
Living people
New York Jets players
Buffalo Bills players
Oklahoma State Cowboys football players
1978 births